The 2019 Tyrepower Tasmania SuperSprint was a motor racing event for the Supercars Championship, held on the weekend of 5 to 7 April 2019. The event was held at Symmons Plains Raceway in Launceston, Tasmania, and was scheduled to consist of one race of 120 kilometres and one race of 200 kilometres in length. It was the third event of fifteen in the 2019 Supercars Championship and hosted Races 7 and 8 of the season. The event was the 47th running of the Tasmania SuperSprint.

Scott McLaughlin won Race 7 while Shane van Gisbergen won Race 8.

Background

Entry alterations
The round was open to wildcard entries from the Super2 Series and saw the grid expand to twenty-five entries. Brad Jones Racing entered an extra Holden Commodore ZB for 19-year-old Jack Smith, who would make his debut in the category.

Results

Practice

Race 7

Qualifying

Notes
 - Jamie Whincup had his fastest lap time revoked and was barred from taking further part in qualifying after triggering a red flag in Q2.

Race

Race 8

Qualifying

Notes
 - Macauley Jones had his fastest lap time revoked and was barred from taking further part in qualifying after triggering a red flag in Q1.

Race

References

Tasmania SuperSprint
Motorsport in Tasmania
Tasmania SuperSprint
2000s in Tasmania